Flood Modeller is a computer program developed by Jacobs that simulates the flow of water through river channels, urban drainage networks and across floodplains using a range of one- and two-dimensional hydraulic solvers. The software incorporates a user interface for building, running and viewing the results of models, including a GIS map interface.

Flood Modeller was previously known as ISIS software (named after the local name for the Upper Thames).

The software has been independently benchmarked by the Environment Agency and has helped thousands of users transform how they undertake modelling and how they share and communicate flood-related information with clients and members of the public.

Initially developed by Halcrow Group and then CH2M Hill, Flood Modeller is now developed by Jacobs Engineering group.

Solvers

1D solvers 

Flood Modeller includes steady-state and unsteady 1D river solvers for modelling open-channels.

It also provides a 1D urban solver for modelling urban drainage systems.

2D solvers 

Flood Modeller includes three different 2D solvers:
 The ADI solver is based on the DIVAST numerical engine first developed in the 1980s, and is designed to simulate fluvial, overland, estuarine and coastal situations where flow does not rapidly change.
 The TVD solver is designed to represent rapid changes in the water surface profile, but results in longer run-times.
 The FAST solver uses simplified hydraulics to perform rapid assessments of flooding.

See also 

 Hydrology
 Surface-water hydrology
 Hydrological transport model
 HEC-RAS
 SWMM
 GIS
 Computer simulation

References

External links 
Flood Modeller website

2015 software
Hydrology models
Scientific simulation software